Tasev is a Bulgarian and Macedonian masculine surname, its feminine counterpart is Taseva. It may refer to
Atanas Tasev (born 1921), Bulgarian sports shooter
Irina Taseva (1910–1990), Bulgarian actress
Katrin Taseva (born 1997), Bulgarian rhythmic gymnast
Toni Tasev (born 1994), Bulgarian football winger 

Bulgarian-language surnames
Macedonian-language surnames